Cordoba Private University, formerly known as Mamoun University for Science and Technology (MUST), was established by the Republic Decree No. 294 of the year 2003 at its headquarters in the city of Al-Qamishli in Al-Hasakah Governorate and its branch in Aleppo Governorate, to be one of the first private Syrian universities. 

It contains three colleges, namely the College of Administrative and Financial Sciences and the Faculty of Living Languages and Human Sciences and the College of Engineering and Technology.

In the year 2011, Syrian Engineers Association has acquired Mamoun University for Science and Technology, then in 2nd Feb 2014, The Minister of Higher Education, Dr. Malek Ali, has issued a decree No. 154 approving the change of the name of Mamoun Private University for Science and Technology, to be Cordoba Private University, upon the request of the Syrian Engineers Association, the owner of the university.

The Mamoun University is under an academic cooperation agreement with the University of Sunderland.

Faculties
Engineering and Technology
Management and Finance Science
Languages and Humanities
 Dentistry
 Architecture

References

External links
 Official Website

Universities in Syria
Education in Aleppo
Educational institutions established in 2003
2003 establishments in Syria